Glaucodon is an extinct genus of marsupial from Australia.

References

Further reading
Wildlife of Gondwana: Dinosaurs and Other Vertebrates from the Ancient Supercontinent (Life of the Past) by Pat Vickers Rich, Thomas Hewitt Rich, Francesco Coffa, and Steven Morton
Prehistoric Mammals of Australia and New Guinea: One Hundred Million Years of Evolution by John A. Long, Michael Archer, Timothy Flannery, and Suzanne Hand

Prehistoric dasyuromorphs
Pliocene mammals of Australia
Prehistoric marsupial genera
Pliocene marsupials
Fossil taxa described in 1957